The 2003 Popular Democratic Party primaries were the primary elections by which voters of the Popular Democratic Party (PPD) chose its nominees for various political offices of Puerto Rico for the 2004 general elections. They were held on November 9, 2003. Incumbent Resident Commissioner Aníbal Acevedo Vilá faced no opposition for his candidacy, making him the official candidate for the elections.

Candidates

Senate

At-large

 Eudaldo Báez Galib
 Severo Colberg Toro
 Antonio Fas Alzamora
 Velda González de Modestti
 Sila Mari González Calderón

 Juan Eugenio Hernández Mayoral
 Alfredo Freddy López
 Sergio Peña Clos
 Armandito Torres

District
The Popular Democratic Party held primaries on only 6 of the 8 senatorial districts.

San Juan
 Victor de la Cruz
 José Ortíz Dalliot
 Margarita Ostolaza

Arecibo
 Nelson Cintrón
 Lucy Molinari
 María Elena Perez
 Francis Rivera
 Julio Rodríguez
 Rafael Rodríguez

Mayagüez-Aguadilla
 Rafael Irizarry
 Taty Jiménez
 Luis Loperena
 Jorge Ramos Vélez
 Esther Soto

Ponce
 Modesto Agosto Alicea
 Bruno Ramos
 Jean Rodríguez Pazo

Guayama
 Jose L. Colón Sánchez
 Cirilo Tirado Rivera
 Angel M. Rodríguez

Carolina
 Juan Cancel Alegría
 Yasmín Mejías
 Melba Rivera

House of Representatives

At-large

 Jorge Colberg Toro
 Héctor Ferrer
 Ferdinand Perez
 Julia Torres

 Luis Vega Ramos
 Jose Eligio Velez
 Carlos Vizcarrondo

District
The Popular Democratic Party held primaries on 22 of the 40 representative districts.

District 1
 Herminio Pagán
 José Segui

District 3
 Modesto Estrada
 Carlos Morales

District 7
 Lara Aponte
 Adalberto Pérez

District 9
 Manolo Díaz
 Reynaldo Díaz
 Luis Hernández

District 10
 Marcos Berríos
 Angel Cabrera
 Angel Díaz

District 12
 Eggie Negrón
 Raúl Negrón
 Freddie Ramos
 Rubén Soto

District 13
 Eduardo Martínez
 Joaquín Tirado

District 14
 Ramón Dasta
 Yamil Juarbe

District 15
 Rafael Reichard
 José "Tato" Ruíz

District 16
 Sergio Ortíz
 José Rodríguez

District 17
 Milton Morales
 Lourdes Ríos
 Félix Vega

District 18
 Tony Méndez
 Elvis Morales
 Miguel Ruíz

District 19
 Charlie Hernández
 Rafael Rivera

District 20
 Evelyn Alicea
 Carlos Bianchi Angleró
 Jesús Casiano
 Monchy Ramos
 Israel Rivera
 Eduardo Rosado

District 22
 Otilio Plaza
 Ramón Ruíz

District 24
 Roberto Cruz
 Luis Farinacci

District 28
 Che Díaz
 Luisito Figueroa
 Epifanio Galarza
 Honis Fuentes Villanueva
 Cheo Rivera

District 29
 José Castrodad
 José Rodríguez
 Víctor Suárez

District 30
 Carlos Picart
 Ricky Valero

District 33
 Jesús Collazo
 Sara Rosario

District 34
 Orlando de Jesús
 Luis A. Ortíz
 David Sánchez

District 38
 Pedrito Rodríguez
 Raymond Rivera

Mayors
The Popular Democratic Party held primaries on 19 of 78 municipalities.

Aguada
 Harry Luis
 Miguelito Ruíz

Aguadilla
 Agustín Méndez
 David Villanueva

Aibonito
 J.A. "Bertito" Díaz
 Edgardo Rodríguez

Arecibo
 Frankie Hernández
 Ervin Sánchez

Arroyo
 Carmencita González
 Blanca López

Cabo Rojo
 Emilio Carlo Acosta
 Nelson Vincenty

Canóvanas
 Junior Meléndez
 Ermelindo Sánchez

Cataño
 Jorge Díaz
 Félix Fuentes

Hatillo
 Aníbal Gerena
 José A. Rodríguez Cruz

Hormigueros
 Pedro García Figueroa
 Luis Angel

Humacao
 Orlando Rodríguez
 Marcelo Trujillo
 Ramón Iván Vega

Lajas
 César Corales
 Marcos "Turin" Irizarry

Loíza
 Irma Delgado Arroyo
 Virgilio Escobar
 Julito Osorio

Morovis
 Francisco Rodríguez
 Mañy Rosario

Salinas
 José Díaz Rivera
 Abraham López

San Juan
 Eduardo Bhatia
 Roberto Vigoreaux

Santa Isabel
 Ricky Mercado
 Raúl Pérez Ramírez
 Sánchez

Toa Alta
 Rafael López
 Samuel Medina

Vega Alta
 Colón
 Rafael Martínez

Results

Senate

At-large

House of Representatives

At-large

See also

 New Progressive Party primaries, 2003

References

Primary elections in Puerto Rico
2003 Puerto Rico elections
Popular Democratic Party (Puerto Rico)